The Quileute , are a Native American people in western Washington state in the United States, currently numbering approximately 2,000. They are a federally recognized tribe: the Quileute Tribe of the Quileute Reservation.

The Quileute people were forced onto the Quileute Indian Reservation after signing the Quinault Treaty in 1855. Their reservation is located near the southwest corner of Clallam County, Washington, at the mouth of the Quillayute River on the Pacific coast. They are part of the Coast Salish people (Pacific Northwest Coast) and the Quinault people (Washington State).

The reservation's main population center is the community of La Push, Washington. The 2000 census reported an official resident population of 371 people on the reservation, which has a land area of 4.061 km² (1.5678 sq mi, or 1,003.4 acres).

The Quileute language belongs to the Chimakuan family of languages among Northwest Coast indigenous peoples. The Quileute language is an isolate, as the only related aboriginal people to the Quileute, the Chimakum, were destroyed by Chief Seattle and the Suquamish people during the 1860s. The Quileute language is one of only six known languages lacking nasal sounds (i.e., m and n).

Like many Northwest Coast nations, in precontact times the Quileute relied on fishing from local rivers and the Pacific Ocean for food. They built plank houses (longhouses) to protect themselves from the harsh, wet winters west of the Cascade Mountains. The Quileute, along with the Makah, were once also whalers.

Government  
The Quileute tribe is governed by a democratically elected tribal council, who served in staggered, three-year terms. The tribe's current administration is:
 Chairman: Douglas Woodruff Jr.
 Vice-Chairman: Zachary Jones
 Secretary: Skyler Foster
 Treasurer: Rio Jaime
 Member at Large: Tony Foster.

Artwork and material culture 
Historically the Quileute were talented builders and craftsmen. Like many other tribes in the region, they were excellent boat and canoe makers. They could make canoes for whaling, which could hold tons of cargo and many men. The modern clipper ship's hull uses a design much like the canoes used by the Quileutes. 

The Quileutes used the resources from the land to make tools and other items. In the region, almost everything was made out of wood. Necessities like utensils, clothing, weapons, and paints were made from the available natural resources. In terms of arts and crafts, the Quileute Tribe is best known for their woven baskets and dog-hair blankets. The tribe would raise specially bred, woolly dogs for their hair, which they would spin and weave into blankets. They would also weave incredibly fine baskets that were so tightly woven that they could hold water. They could boil water in some of them. 

Using cedar bark, they made waterproof skirts and hats to shield their bodies against the heavy rainfall in the region.

Ethnobotany 
The Quileute have extensive knowledge of the medicinal qualities of their homelands' flora. They use velvetleaf huckleberries, Vaccinium myrtilloides, by eating the uncooked berries, stewing the berries to make a sauce, and canning the berries and using them as food.

Religion and cosmology 
The Quileute's belief system holds that every person had an individual guardian. They would pray to the guardian, along with the sun and Tsikáti (the universe). Much of their original religion was lost after the disruption of European encounter, diseases, losses and colonization. James Island, an island visible from First Beach, has played a role in all aspects of Quileute beliefs and culture. Originally called A-Ka-Lat ("Top of the Rock"), it was used as a fortress to keep opposing tribes out and served as a burial ground for chiefs.

As told much in their folklore, the Quileute descended from wolves. Quileute myths proclaim that the two-sided mythical character known as Dokibatt and K’wa’iti was responsible for creating the first human of the Quileute tribe by transforming a wolf. In the beginning there were five tribal societies that represented the elk hunter, the whale hunter, the fisherman, the weather predictor, and the medicine man. The medicine man honored the creator with the wolf dance. Quileute folklore is still very much alive in the area of the Quileute Nation near La Push.

Language

The Quileute tribe speaks a language called Quileute or Quillayute, which is part of the Chimakuan family of languages. The Chimakum, who also spoke a Chimakuan language (called Chemakum, Chimakum, or Chimacum,) were the only other group of people to speak a language from this language family.

In 1999, the last native speaker of the Quileute language died, meaning the language is considered extinct, although three or four users in their 50s retain some knowledge of vocabulary. Up until then, it was spoken only by tribal elders at La Push, and some of the Makah.

Quileute is one of the 13 known languages that are recorded to have no nasal consonants. The tribe is now trying to prevent the loss of the language by teaching it in the Quileute Tribal School, using books written for the students by the tribal elders.

The Quileute Nation Culture and Language Committee released a language and culture app in 2021 in an effort to preserve the language and culture of their people. Efforts to introduce Quileute phrases into everyday life was started in 2007 through the Quileute Revitalization Project, by providing tribe members with accessible information on basic vocabulary words and phrases. The Quileute Nation has continued this project through downloadable alphabet sheets and providing audiobooks read in Quileute.

Colonization 
The Quileute relationship with Europeans and Euro-Americans began with encounters between the Quileute and the crews of European ships. Quileute tradition suggests that the earliest encounter was with Spanish sailors who shipwrecked somewhere north of La Push. Another potential the early encounter was with the crew of the he Spanish schooner Sonora, captained by Juan Francisco de la Bodega y Quadra in 1775. The Sonora encountered several Indians in the waters near the mouth of the Quinault River. After some trading, the encounter culminated in bloodshed with several Indians killed, and six Spaniards killed or enslaved. While the encounter is generally considered to have been between the Quinault people and the Spanish, some authors believe the encounter may have involved the Quileute. In 1787, a small boat crew from the Imperial Eagle was killed by Indians near Destruction Island. The Columbia traded for furs with the village of La Push in 1792. The Russian schooner Nikolai ran aground on a beach north of the Quillayute River in 1808. The crew was killed or enslaved. 

Quileute tradition has many accounts of un-dated shipwrecks. One is of a French side-wheeled paddle steamer. The shipwrecked crew lived at La Push for many years, and called the mouth of the river "La Bouche." Possibly, this is the source of the village's current name: La Push.

The first official negotiations with the United States government occurred in 1855 when Isaac Stevens and the Quileute signed the Treaty of Olympia. They ceded great amounts of land and agreed to resettle on the Quinault Reservation.

ARTICLE 1. The said tribes and bands hereby cede, relinquish, and convey to the United States all their right, title, and interest in and to the lands and country occupied by them…

Article 11 of the Treaty of Olympia was a single sentence:

ARTICLE 11. The said tribes and bands agree to free all slaves now held by them, and not to purchase or acquire others hereafter.

This article took away an integral part of the culture of the Northwest Coastal tribes, the rights to possess slaves. Their culture had been focused on possessions and they had always owned slaves. Later, in 1882, A.W. Smith came to La Push to teach the native children. He made a school and started to change the names of the people from tribal names to ones from the Bible. In 1889, after years of this not being enforced, President Cleveland gave the Quileute tribe the La Push reservation. 252 residents moved there and in 1894, 71 people from the Hoh River got their own reservation. In 1889, a non-native individual who wanted the land at La Push started a fire that burned down all the houses on the reservation, along with many artifacts from the days before the Europeans came.

Quileute Tribal School 

The Quileute Tribal School serves K-12 tribal and non-tribal students from La Push, Forks, and the Hoh Reservation. The school has an elected five member school board and a hired superintendent. In 2020-2021 131 students from 14 different tribal heritages were enrolled.  The school is currently the focus of the organization 'Move to Higher Ground' which hopes to relocate the school outside of the current tsunami zone.  Ground was broken on July 1, 2020 for a new campus. Classes are set to begin in the new campus in fall of 2022.

Quileute Tribe in Fiction
In Susan Sharpe's 1991 novel Spirit Quest, eleven-year-old Aaron Singer spends part of his summer vacation on the Quileute Indian Reservation in Washington. There he becomes friends with Robert, a Quileute boy. At the encouragement of his family, who no longer incorporate many of their traditions into daily life, Robert attends tribal school to learn the Quileute language and culture. At Aaron's urging, the boys go together on their version of a "spirit quest", where Aaron finds and saves a trapped eagle. Though he admires and respects Robert's culture, Aaron realizes that he can never be a part of it the way Robert is. Aaron's initially romantic view is replaced by deeper understanding.

Stephenie Meyer's Twilight series features Jacob Black and other werewolf characters, all fictional members of the Quileute tribe and residents of La Push. It has been heavily criticized for its negative depiction of native people and culture and the incorrect telling of the Quileute stories. The Quileute tribe received no compensation from Twilight, despite their name and culture being appropriated. The Burke Museum created a website to combat all the misconceptions and educate fans about the truth of the Quileute tribe.

Historian Daniel Immerwahr posits that the Fremen in Frank Herbert's Dune are based on Herbert's interactions with Henry Martin, or Han-daa-sho, a fisherman who lived on the Quileute reservation in La Push, Washington.

References

Sources
 Quileute Reservation, Washington. United States Census Bureau.
 "History," Quileute Nation, April 23, 2008
 Joahnsen, Bruce Elliot. Native Peoples of North America, Vol. 2
 Powell, James V. "Quileute", Smithsonian Encyclopedia, Vol. 7: Northwest Indians
 Silverberg, Robert. The Home of the Red Man: Indian America Before Columbus. p. 214. New York Graphic Society: 1963
 
 "Quileute Indian Tribe," U-S-History.com
 "Tribal Council/Departments". Quileute Nation
 "North American Indian Bibliography: Northwest Coast"
 Leggatt, Judith and Kristin Burnett. "Biting Bella: Treaty Negotiation, Quileute History, and Why 'Team Jacob' Is Doomed to Lose" in Nancy Reagin (ed.) Twilight and History. New York: Wiley & Sons, 2010

External links

 Quileute Nation Official Website
 Quileute Oceanside Resort Website

 
Indigenous peoples of the Pacific Northwest Coast
Native American tribes in Washington (state)